Robert Martin Lusk (1851–1913) was a lawyer, politician and judge in Texas and California.

Lusk was born in Bradley County, Tennessee, in 1851. He attended Hiwassee College and was graduated from the law department at Cumberland University, both in Tennessee. He practiced law in Dalton, Georgia, and in Bonham, Texas, where he was elected mayor and was then prosecuting attorney for the county. In 1885 he was elected to the Texas State Legislature. He was a superior court judge in Texas in 1888–89.

Lusk moved to Los Angeles in 1902 and joined a reform movement in the city. In the first nonpartisan campaign under a new city charter, he was a candidate for tax collector. In 1905 he was appointed to the council to fill the unexpired term of John D. Works, who was running for the U.S. Senate. Lusk was then elected to a four-year term.

He died in his Los Angeles home at 147 North Soto Street on February 21, 1913, and a funeral service was held two days later at Boyle Heights Presbyterian Church, conducted by the Rev. L.C. Kirkes, pastor. Interment was at Evergreen Cemetery, Los Angeles.

He was survived by his wife, three daughters, Ruth, Mrs. C.A. Mills and Mrs. Frank Miller; and two sons, Henry and Paul.

References

Superior court judges in the United States
Members of the Texas House of Representatives
Texas lawyers
Presidents of the Los Angeles City Council
People from Bradley County, Tennessee
Hiwassee College alumni
Cumberland University alumni
1851 births
1913 deaths
Burials at Evergreen Cemetery, Los Angeles
People from Boyle Heights, Los Angeles